Meall an t-Seallaidh (852 m) is a mountain in the Southern Highlands of Scotland. It is located in the Loch Lomond and The Trossachs National Park, west of Loch Earn.

The mountain rises steeply from the village of Balquhidder.

References

Mountains and hills of Stirling (council area)
Marilyns of Scotland
Corbetts
Mountains and hills of the Southern Highlands